Alex North (born Isadore Soifer, December 4, 1910 – September 8, 1991) was an American composer best known for his many film scores, including A Streetcar Named Desire (one of the first jazz-based film scores),  Viva Zapata!, Spartacus, Cleopatra, and Who's Afraid of Virginia Woolf? He was the first composer to receive an Honorary Academy Award, but never won a competitive Oscar despite fifteen nominations.

He wrote the music for Unchained Melody as the theme for the prison film Unchained (1955), It has become a standard and one of the most recorded songs of the 20th century, with over 1,500 recordings made by more than 670 artists, in multiple languages.

Early life
North was born Isadore Soifer in Chester, Pennsylvania, to Jewish parents Jesse and Baila (Bessie) who had left the Russian Empire for the US around 1906. Jesse was from Bila Tserkva and Besie originated from Odessa (both cities are now in Ukraine). In the US, Jesse was a blacksmith, and Bessie ran a grocery store. During the Second World War, North served as a captain in the United States Army Special Services division from 1942 to 1946. There, he was responsible for "self-entertainment" programs in mental hospitals. He also composed music for more than twenty-six documentaries for the War Department while in the service.

Career
North managed to integrate his modernism into typical film music leitmotif structure, rich with themes. One of these became the famous song "Unchained Melody". Nominated for fifteen Oscars but unsuccessful each time, North is one of only two film composers to receive the Lifetime Achievement Academy Award, the other being Ennio Morricone. North's frequent collaborator as orchestrator was the avant-garde composer Henry Brant. He won the 1968 Golden Globe award for his music to The Shoes of the Fisherman (1968).

His best-known film scores include A Streetcar Named Desire, Death of a Salesman, Viva Zapata!, The Rainmaker, Spartacus, The Misfits, Cleopatra, Who's Afraid of Virginia Woolf?, Dragonslayer and Under the Volcano. His music for The Wonderful Country makes use of Mexican and American motifs.

His commissioned score for 2001: A Space Odyssey is notorious for having been discarded by director Stanley Kubrick. Although North later incorporated motifs from the rejected score for The Shoes of the Fisherman, Shanks and Dragonslayer, the score itself remained unheard until composer Jerry Goldsmith rerecorded it for Varèse Sarabande in 1993. In 2007, Intrada Records released the 1968 recording sessions on CD from North's personal archives.

North was also commissioned to write a jazz score for Nero Wolfe, a 1959 CBS-TV series based on Rex Stout's Nero Wolfe characters, starring William Shatner as Archie Goodwin and Kurt Kasznar as Nero Wolfe.  A pilot and two or three episodes were filmed, but the designated time slot was, in the end, given to another series. North's unheard score for Nero Wolfe and six recorded tracks on digital audio tape are in the UCLA Music Library Special Collections. He also wrote the music for various other television shows, such as the anthologies Climax! and Playhouse 90.

Though North is best known for his work in Hollywood, he spent years in New York writing music for the stage; he composed the score, for the original Broadway production of Death of a Salesman.  It was in New York that he met Elia Kazan (director of Salesman), who brought him to Hollywood in the 1950s.  North was one of several composers who brought the influence of contemporary concert music into film, in part marked by an increased use of dissonance and complex rhythms.  But there is also a lyrical quality to much of his work which may be connected to the influence of Aaron Copland, with whom he studied.

His classical works include two symphonies and a Rhapsody for Piano, Trumpet obbligato and Orchestra. He was nominated for a Grammy Award for his score for the 1976 television miniseries Rich Man, Poor Man, and went on to score the sequel Rich Man, Poor Man Book II and the 1978 miniseries The Word. North is also known for his opening to the CBS television anthology series Playhouse 90 and the 1965 ABC television miniseries FDR.

Legacy and recognition 
North was recognized for his lifetime achievement in 2004 from the Sammy Film Music Awards.

In 2016, the Library of Congress added North's 1951 recording of his score to "A Streetcar Named Desire" to its National Recording Registry.

Death 
North died on September 8, 1991 in Los Angeles, California.  He was cremated and his ashes were scattered at sea.

Awards
The American Film Institute ranked North's score for A Streetcar Named Desire #19 on their list of the greatest film scores. His scores for the following films were also nominated for the list:
Cleopatra (1963)
The Misfits (1961)
Spartacus (1960)
Viva Zapata! (1952)
Who's Afraid of Virginia Woolf? (1966)

North was nominated for fifteen Academy Awards throughout his career, one for Best Original Song, the rest in the Best Original Score category, making him the most-nominated composer to have never won.  He was however awarded an Honorary Academy Award in 1986; he was the first composer to receive it.

Nominated - A Streetcar Named Desire (1951)
Nominated - Death of a Salesman (1951)
Nominated - Viva Zapata! (1952)
Nominated - The Rose Tattoo (1955)
Nominated - Best Original Song (with Hy Zaret) "Unchained Melody" (1955)
Nominated - The Rainmaker (1956)
Nominated - Spartacus (1960)
Nominated - Cleopatra (1963)
Nominated - The Agony and the Ecstasy (1965)
Nominated - Who's Afraid of Virginia Woolf? (1966)
Nominated - The Shoes of the Fisherman (1968)
Nominated - Shanks (1974)
Nominated - Bite the Bullet (1975)
Nominated - Dragonslayer (1981)
Nominated - Under the Volcano (1984)
Winner - Honorary Oscar for memorable achievement in a host of distinguished motion pictures (1986)

Golden Globe Awards for Original Score:
Nominated - Spartacus (1960)
Winner - The Shoes of the Fisherman (1968)

ASCAP Award for Original Score:
Winner - Lifetime Achievement (1986)
Winner - Good Morning, Vietnam (1987)

Grammy Awards for Original Score:
Nominated - Cleopatra (1963)
Nominated - Who's Afraid of Virginia Woolf? (1966)
Nominated - Rich Man, Poor Man (1976)

Selected filmography

A Streetcar Named Desire (1951)
Death of a Salesman (1951)
Viva Zapata! (1952)
Les Misérables (1952)
Désirée (1954)
Unchained (1955)
The Rose Tattoo (1955)
I'll Cry Tomorrow (1955)
The Bad Seed (1956)
The Rainmaker (1956)
The King and Four Queens (1956)
The Long, Hot Summer (1958)
Stage Struck (1958)
Hot Spell (1958)
The Sound and the Fury (1959)
The Wonderful Country (1959)
Spartacus (1960)
The Misfits (1961)
Sanctuary (1961)
The Children's Hour (1961)
All Fall Down (1962)
Cleopatra (1963)
Cheyenne Autumn (1964)
The Outrage (1964)
The Agony and the Ecstasy (1965)
Who's Afraid of Virginia Woolf? (1966)
The Devil's Brigade (1968)
The Shoes of the Fisherman (1968)
Hard Contract (1969)
A Dream of Kings (1969)
Willard (1971)
Pocket Money (1972)
Shanks (1974)
Bite the Bullet (1975)
Journey into Fear (1975)
Somebody Killed Her Husband (1978)
Wise Blood (1979)
Carny (1980)
Dragonslayer (1981)
Under the Volcano (1984)
Prizzi's Honor (1985)
The Dead (1987)
Good Morning, Vietnam (1987)
The Penitent (1988)

References

External links

 
 
 
 Alex North website maintained by his family.
 
 Unchained Melody Publishing LLC is the publishing administrator for "Unchained Melody".
 Alex North papers, Margaret Herrick Library, Academy of Motion Picture Arts and Sciences

1910 births
1991 deaths
People from Chester, Pennsylvania
Academy Honorary Award recipients
Golden Globe Award-winning musicians
American male classical composers
Jewish American classical composers
American classical composers
Emmy Award winners
People from Ridgefield, Connecticut
American film score composers
RCA Victor artists
American jazz composers
American male jazz composers
20th-century classical composers
American people of Russian-Jewish descent
Jazz-influenced classical composers
20th-century American composers
Jazz musicians from Pennsylvania
Jazz musicians from Connecticut
Classical musicians from Pennsylvania
American male film score composers
20th-century American male musicians
Varèse Sarabande Records artists
20th-century American Jews